Michael Richard Platt Jr. (born 1974) is an American political aide and government official who served as Assistant Secretary for Legislative and Intergovernmental Affairs during the Trump administration. Prior to assuming this position, he was chief of staff for U.S. Representative Marsha Blackburn of Tennessee's 7th congressional district.

Education
In 1996, Platt obtained a Bachelor of Arts degree in political science from the University of Arkansas at Fayetteville.

Career 
Platt began his career as a legislative staffer for Asa Hutchinson, who was then serving as the U.S. representative for Arkansas's 3rd congressional district. He went on to work as a lobbyist for the Recording Industry Association of America and TechNet.

Platt advised Congresswoman Marsha Blackburn on various public policy issues including telecommunications, trade, and intellectual property. He then served as Blackburn's chief of staff before being confirmed as Assistant Secretary of Commerce for Legislative and Intergovernmental Affairs in August 2017.

References

1974 births
Living people
University of Arkansas alumni
Arkansas Republicans
United States Department of Commerce officials
Trump administration personnel
American lobbyists
People from Gravette, Arkansas
People from Alexandria, Virginia